The Experimental Physics and Industrial Control System (EPICS) is a set of software tools and applications used to develop and implement distributed control systems to operate devices such as particle accelerators, telescopes and other large scientific facilities. The tools are designed to help develop systems which often feature large numbers of networked computers delivering control and feedback. They also provide SCADA capabilities.

History 
EPICS was initially developed as the Ground Test Accelerator Controls System (GTACS) at Los Alamos National Laboratory (LANL) in 1988 by Bob Dalesio, Jeff Hill, et al.  In 1989, Marty Kraimer from Argonne National Laboratory (ANL) came to work alongside the GTA controls team for 6 months, bringing his experience from his work on the Advanced Photon Source (APS) Control System to the project. The resulting software was renamed EPICS and was presented at the International Conference on Accelerator and Large Experimental Physics Control Systems (ICALEPCS) in 1991.

EPICS was originally available under a commercial license, with enhanced versions sold by Tate & Kinetic Systems. Licenses for collaborators were free, but required a legal agreement with LANL and APS. An EPICS community was established and development grew as more facilities joined in with the collaboration. In February 2004, EPICS became freely distributable after its release under the EPICS Open License.

It is now used and developed by over 50 large science institutions worldwide, as well as by several commercial companies.

Architecture
EPICS uses client–server and publish–subscribe techniques to communicate between computers. Servers, the “input/output controllers” (IOCs), collect experiment and control data in real time, using the measurement instruments attached to them. This information is then provided to clients, using the high-bandwidth Channel Access (CA) or the recently added pvAccess networking protocols that are designed to suit real-time applications such as scientific experiments.

IOCs hold and interact with a database of "records", which represent either devices or aspects of the devices to be controlled. IOCs can be hosted by stock-standard servers or PCs or by VME, MicroTCA, and other standard embedded system processors. For "hard real-time" applications the RTEMS or VxWorks operating systems are normally used, whereas "soft real-time" applications typically run on Linux or Microsoft Windows.

Data held in the records are represented by unique identifiers known as Process Variables (PVs). These PVs are accessible over the network channels provided by the CA/pvAccess protocol.

Many record types are available for various types of input and output (e.g., analog or binary) and to provide functional behaviour such as calculations. It is also possible to create custom record types. Each record consists of a set of fields, which hold the record's static and dynamic data and specify behaviour when various functions are requested locally or remotely. Most record types are listed in the EPICS record reference manual.

Graphical user interface packages are available, allowing users to view and interact with PV data through typical display widgets such as dials and text boxes. Examples include EDM (Extensible Display Manager), MEDM (Motif/EDM), and CSS.

Any software that implements the CA/pvAccess protocol can read and write PV values. Extension packages are available to provide support for MATLAB, LabVIEW, Perl, Python, Tcl, ActiveX, etc. These can be used to write scripts to interact with EPICS-controlled equipment.

Facilities using EPICS

Commercial Users 

 BiRa Systems
Ciemat
 CosyLab
 GLResearch
 idt
Mobiis
 Observatory Sciences
 Osprey Distributed Control Systems
 Varian Medical Systems
 Pyramid Technical Consultants

See also

 TANGO control system
 SCADA—Supervisory Control And Data Acquisition

References

External links

EPICS Record Reference Manual
Science software
Physics software
Experimental particle physics
Industrial automation software